Guwani is a village in Narnaul Tehsil, Mahendragarh District, Haryana, India, in Gurgaon division. Its postal head office is at Narnaul.

Demographics of 2011
As of 2011 India census, Guwani had a population of 3215 in 589 households. Males (1693) constitute 52.65%  of the population and females (1522) 47.34%. Guwani has an average literacy (2188) rate of 68.05%, lower than the national average of 74%: male literacy (1311) is 59.91%, and female literacy (877) is 40.08% of total literates (2188). In Guwani, Mahendergarh 11.97% of the population is under 6 years of age (385).

References 

Villages in Mahendragarh district